Zeitoun is a district of Gaza, located in the southern part of the city.

History
It was built in the 1930s and 1940s as Gaza developed outside its center. Much of the funding for the initial construction is attributed to foreign institutions, such as missionary hospitals. After the 1948 Arab-Israeli War, with the influx of Palestinian refugees, Zeitoun's population swelled. Ahmed Yassin's family settled the district in the 1950s.

During the 2008-2009 Israel-Gaza conflict, the Israel Defense Forces (IDF) launched a ground incursion in the area, occupying the district. During this period, 48 Palestinians, mostly from three families, were killed. In addition, 27 homes, a number of farms, and a mosque were destroyed.

References

Bibliography

Populated places established in the 1930s
Neighborhoods of Gaza City